Gaius Claudius Marcellus can refer to:

Gaius Claudius Marcellus (praetor 80 BC), Roman governor of Sicily
Gaius Claudius Marcellus, son of Marcus Claudius Marcellus, a Catilinarian conspirator, possibly related to the consul in 50 BC.
Gaius Claudius Marcellus (consul 50 BC)
Gaius Claudius Marcellus (consul 49 BC)